Matthew Rowan (died April 1760) was a British colonial official who was the acting governor of North Carolina from 1753 to 1754.

Biography 
Matthew Rowan was born in County Antrim, Ireland, but the date of his birth remains unknown. He was the son of Reverend John Rowan and the former Margaret Stewart and had eight brothers and three sisters. Although it is not known when Rowan emigrated to North Carolina, it is recorded that he lived in Bath in 1726, serving as a church warden. In addition, he was a merchant and shipbuilder in the colony. Rowan joined the assembly in 1727 and the executive council in 1731, where he worked between 1734 and his death in 1760. In 1735, Rowan worked in the survey of the boundary line between North and South Carolina with other men, being appointed surveyor-general of North Carolina.

He was appointed President of the Council and acting governor of North Carolina in 1753, following the death of governor Nathaniel Rice. He held this post until 1754. Rowan died in April 1760. He is buried on the Brunswick County plantation.

He married Elizabeth, the widow of his brother John, in 1742, although they had no children (while she had four daughters). Rowan did father one child, John Rowan, with Jane Stubbs; he acknowledged his paternity and remembered John in his will. Rowan mainly lived in the Lower Cape Fear, near the Brunswick County community (modern Northwest), where he lived in North Carolina.

In 1753, the area that had previously been the northern part of Anson County was formed into Rowan County, named in his honor.

Purportedly, Rowan was the captain of an unregistered 90 foot 2-masted ship named Martha & Eliza which was wrecked on Grand Manon Island in the Bay of Fundy in 1741 carrying Presbyterian Irish expatriates. He abandoned the survivors but later returned to recover the cargo from the wrecked ship. "Several weeks later, at the end of November, the crew returned in a small sloop and schooner to plunder the ship. Apparently, Rowan wanted the valuable cargo but felt no responsibility to save the lives of his passengers. The complaint in the Massachusetts archives states that, “At the time the sloop and schooner came for us, the hands aboard — our mate and others — for reasons best known to themselves, were quite unwilling to land or search for these, though we had seen them that very day on the shore searching for food and eating rockweed, and so left them. Of these we can give no further account.”

The survivors asked for help: “Now, besides these already mentioned that came first aboard the vessel at Londonderry, there is but 48 of us know. In brief, many died at sea and many after we came to land, the corps [corpses]of which lie many of them on the shore, through weakness we were not able to interr them.” The rescue vessel took 48 people to Pleasant Point in Cushing, and Captain Rowan and his henchmen stripped survivors of whatever money and possessions they still had, as payment for their rescue. The complaint continues saying that even some of their clothes were taken, “to leave us almost naked.”

But the Cushing residents, many of whom had come from Northern Ireland themselves, were warm and generous to the new arrivals. It being winter, however, they couldn’t support 48 newcomers for long, so they sent an appeal to provincial officials, signed by Alexander Campbell and William Lunnen. The letter clearly informed them of Rowan’s abuses, and the Massachusetts House of Representatives wasted no time in authorizing provisions for the survivors. A treasurer for Massachusetts Bay Colony reported 250 pounds spent for “sundry provisions sent in the County Sloop to the poor sufferers that were cast ashore at St. George.”

There is no record that Massachusetts ever sent the promised relief to the survivors, or that it sought to bring Captain Rowan to justice. Thirteen years later, Rowan turns up as governor of North Carolina."

References

1760 deaths
Governors of North-Carolina (1712–1776)
Members of the North-Carolina Provincial Council
People from County Antrim
Presidents of the North-Carolina Provincial Council
Year of birth missing